Dulal Murmu is an MLA of Nayagram Vidhan Sabha constituency from All India Trinamool Congress.

References 

Living people
1980 births
People from West Bengal
Trinamool Congress politicians
Vidyasagar University alumni